The 1974 Arizona gubernatorial election took place on November 5, 1974. Incumbent Governor Jack Williams decided not to run for a fourth term as governor. Former United States Ambassador to Bolivia Raúl Héctor Castro, who was the Democratic nominee in 1970, won the Democratic nomination again in 1974, and narrowly won the general election, defeating Republican nominee Russell Williams by 0.85%. Castro was sworn into his first and only term as governor on January 6, 1975.

Prior to the election, there was a recall effort led by Cesar Chavez against incumbent Governor Jack Williams, with 180,000 signatures submitted. Many of the signatures were invalidated by the Attorney General Gary Nelson, but this was eventually overturned. By the time this occurred, however, it was meaningless due to the close proximity of the 1974 gubernatorial election, and thus a recall election did not occur.

Approximately two years into his term as governor, Castro would resign to become United States Ambassador to Argentina.

Republican primary

Candidates
 Russell Williams, member of the Arizona Corporation Commission
 Evan Mecham, former state senator, former nominee for U.S. Senate
 William C. Jacquin, President of the State Senate
 John D. Driggs, Mayor of Phoenix
 Milton H. Graham, former Mayor of Phoenix

Results

Democratic primary

Candidates
 Raúl Héctor Castro, former United States Ambassador to Bolivia, Democratic nominee for governor in 1970
 Jack Ross, car dealer
 Dave Moss, real estate broker
 Walter "Denver" Caudill, Tubac Country Club golf professional

Results

General election

Results

References

1974
1974 United States gubernatorial elections
Gubernatorial
November 1974 events in the United States